The 1944 New Mexico gubernatorial election took place on November 7, 1944, in order to elect the Governor of New Mexico. Incumbent Democrat John J. Dempsey won reelection to a second term.

Primary Results

Republican Primary

Democratic Party

General election

Results

References

gubernatorial
1944
New Mexico
November 1944 events